Thomas Collins (16 April 1882 – 30 July 1929) was a Scottish footballer who played for Heart of Midlothian, Bathgate, East Fife and Tottenham Hotspur.

The full back transferred to Tottenham from Hearts (where he had featured on the losing side in the 1907 Scottish Cup Final) in 1910 for a fee of £825. Collins made a total of 122 appearances in all competitions for Spurs between 1910 and 1915 and scored a solitary goal for the club. English football was then suspended; Collins spent time back in Scotland and made some guest appearances for East Fife.

International career 
While with Hearts, Collins represented Scotland on one occasion, a 1909 British Home Championship match against Wales. He was selected for the Home Scots v Anglo-Scots trial match twice after he moved to Tottenham, but did not gain another full cap.

Military service
Collins served in the Royal Field Artillery during World War I; he saw active service in France and in 1917 suffered near-fatal injuries in a shell blast, with his left arm and leg having to be amputated (he later had an artificial leg fitted).

Career statistics

International

References 

1882 births
1929 deaths
People from Leven, Fife
Scottish footballers
Association football fullbacks
Footballers from Fife 
Scotland international footballers
Scottish Football League players
English Football League players
Heart of Midlothian F.C. players
Bathgate F.C. players
East Fife F.C. players
Tottenham Hotspur F.C. players
Scottish Football League representative players
British Army personnel of World War I 
Royal Field Artillery soldiers